Vallbona may refer to:

Vallbona d'Anoia, a municipality in Catalonia, Spain
Vallbona de les Monges, a municipality in Catalonia, Spain
Vallbona, Barcelona, a district of Barcelona, in Catalonia, Spain
La Pobla de Vallbona, a municipality in the Valencian Community, Spain
Tossal Gros de Vallbona, a mountain in Catalonia